Ahmet Reşat Pasha (1849–1927) was one of the first Ottoman economists with a Western education and upbringing. He lived during the reign of Abdul Hamid II.

In popular media
Ahmet Reşat Pasha plays a role in Ayşe Kulin's 2008 novel Farewell.

References

1849 births
1927 deaths
Turkish economists